Incheon Sungui Stadium was a multi-purpose stadium in Incheon, South Korea. It was formerly used mostly for football matches, and was the home of National League side Incheon Korail. The stadium had a capacity of 35,000 people, with 25,000 seats and 10,000 standing area. It was built in 1920 and was demolished on June 13, 2008 to make space for the Incheon Football Stadium.

Defunct football venues in South Korea
Sports venues completed in 1920
Multi-purpose stadiums in South Korea
Sports venues in Incheon
Jeju United FC
1920 establishments in Korea
2008 disestablishments in South Korea
Sports venues demolished in 2008